Dimension: Dilemma is the first studio album by South Korean boy band Enhypen. It was released on October 12, 2021, through Belift Lab. The album consists of eight tracks, including the lead single "Tamed-Dashed". The repackaged version of the album, Dimension: Answer, was later released on January 10, 2022, including the single "Blessed-Cursed".

Background and release
On August 25, 2021, Belift Lab confirmed that Enhypen would make their comeback at the end of September. On September 2, the agency announced that members Heeseung, Jay, Jake, Sunghoon, and Jungwon tested positive for COVID-19. Member Ni-ki also tested positive three days later. On September 16, Belift Lab announced the members had recovered and that their first full-length album, Dimension: Dilemma, would be released on October 12, following the release of a concept trailer titled "Intro : Whiteout", uploaded on September 17.

On December 9, 2021, Belift confirmed that Enhypen would release a repackage of Dimension: Dilemma titled Dimension: Answer.

Commercial performance
On September 23, it was announced that the album pre-orders had surpassed 600,000 copies in six days. By October 7, pre-orders surpassed 910,000 copies. The album sold 501,748 copies on the first day following its release on the Hanteo charts and also topped the Oricon Daily Album Chart in Japan for two days in a row. On October 25, Dimension: Dilemma debuted at number 11 on Billboard 200 chart, surpassing their previous career high with Border: Carnival, which peaked at number 18. As of November 2021, Dimension: Dilemma has sold over 1.1 million copies on Gaon, becoming Enhypen’s first-ever million-selling album and receiving a million certification from the Korea Music Content Association (KMCA) in December.

On January 8, 2022, it was revealed that pre-orders for Dimension: Answer had surpassed 630,000 copies. The lead single, "Blessed-Cursed", became the group's first song to peak at number one on Gaon Download Chart. The album itself placed first on both the Gaon Album Chart and Oricon Albums Chart, making it Enhypen's third consecutive album to top the latter. Dimension: Answer also appeared in the top 20 of the Billboard 200 at number 13 and became the group's third consecutive number-one on the Billboard World Albums chart.

Track listing

Accolades

Charts

Weekly charts

Monthly charts

Year-end charts

Certifications and sales

Release history

References

2021 debut albums
Korean-language albums
Enhypen albums
Hybe Corporation albums
Genie Music albums
Stone Music Entertainment albums